Andrew David Coster (born ) is the current New Zealand Police Commissioner and former Deputy Police Commissioner. He has served as the New Zealand Commissioner of Police since 3 April 2020.

Early life
Coster was born in 1975 or 1976 in Dunedin, and grew up in Auckland. His father is Professor Gregor Coster, the former Dean of the Wellington Faculty of Health.

Coster holds a Bachelor of Laws (Honours) from the University of Auckland and a Master of Public Management from Victoria University of Wellington.

Career 
Coster joined the New Zealand Police in 1997 and has worked in both frontline and investigative roles. As his career progressed he was appointed to a number of senior roles, including Auckland City Area Commander, South District Commander. Prior to his appointment as Commissioner, Coster was the acting Deputy Commissioner: Strategy & Partnerships. While in this role he oversaw the development of firearms reforms introduced by the Government following the March 2019 Christchurch mosque shootings. 

In 2004 Coster graduated with a Bachelor of Laws with Honours from the University of Auckland, and worked as a Crown prosecutor for Meredith Connell for less than a year.

Coster has also spent time at the Ministry of Justice, having been seconded on a two-year term from 2016 to 2018 as the Deputy Chief Executive for the Ministry.

Police Commissioner
Coster was appointed as the Commissioner of the New Zealand Police on 9 March 2020. Another candidate as Commissioner was Mike Clement, the then-Deputy Commissioner. He started his term on 3 April 2020 at age 44, becoming the youngest person to assume the role.

In mid-February 2021, Coster's efforts to combat gang and gun violence was criticised by the National Party's Justice spokesperson Simon Bridges, who described Coster as a "wokester commissioner" in a Twitter post. On 25 February, Coster defended the Police's "policing by consent" policies in response to criticism by Bridges during a Justice select committee hearing at the New Zealand Parliament.

During the 2022 Wellington protests, Coster unsuccessfully attempted to convince anti-vaccine mandate protesters to voluntarily remove their illegally parked vehicles from the area around the New Zealand Parliament in mid February 2022. After protesters refused to vacate the Parliament grounds, he ruled out pursuing enforcement action against protesters due to concerns about violence. Coster instead announced that Police would pursue a policy of "negotiation and de-escalation." Coster's decision to rule out "enforcement action" was criticised by the National Party's police spokesman Mark Mitchell, who claimed that Coster had lost credibility as Police Commissioner. On 2 March, Police evicted the remaining anti-mandate protesters following a violent riot.

References

External links
 

1970s births
Living people
20th-century New Zealand public servants
21st-century New Zealand public servants
People from Dunedin
New Zealand Commissioners of Police